Graham is a small unincorporated community in Washington Township, Daviess County, Indiana.

According to one source, Graham took its name from Graham Farms.

Geography

References

Unincorporated communities in Daviess County, Indiana
Unincorporated communities in Indiana